Oleg Evgyenevich Sakirkin (January 23, 1966 – March 18, 2015) was a triple jumper from Shymkent, Ongutsik Qazaqstan, who represented the USSR and later Kazakhstan. His greatest achievement came in 1987 when he won the World Championship bronze medal with a personal best jump of 17.43 metres. He went on to win the 1988 European Indoor Championships (17.30 m) and the 1994 Asian Games (17.21 m).

Sakirkin was twice a silver medallist at the Summer Universiade  (1989 and 1993) and was runner-up at the 1993 Asian Athletics Championships. He also had victories at the 1988 IAAF Grand Prix (17.50 m), the 1989 European Cup (17.17 m), the 1993 IAAF Grand Prix (17.49 m), the 1994 IAAF Grand Prix Final (17.49 m), .

In 1989 he improved his personal best to 17.58 metres and set the USSR outdoor record.  He held the Asian indoor record (17.09 m), set at the 1993 USSR Championships, for twenty years and was eventually beaten by Dong Bin in 2013. Sakirkin's Asian outdoor record (17.35 m, set at the Brothers Znamensky Memorial) stood from 1994 to 2009.  He set 17 Kazakh national records starting from 17.02 m up to the current record of 17.58 m.  He also competed at the 2000 Olympics without reaching the final.

Sakirkin died on March 18, 2015. He was 49.

International competitions

References

External links

1966 births
2015 deaths
Kazakhstani male triple jumpers
Soviet male triple jumpers
Olympic athletes of Kazakhstan
Athletes (track and field) at the 2000 Summer Olympics
Asian Games medalists in athletics (track and field)
Athletes (track and field) at the 1994 Asian Games
World Athletics Championships athletes for the Soviet Union
World Athletics Championships medalists
Universiade medalists in athletics (track and field)
Goodwill Games medalists in athletics
Asian Games gold medalists for Kazakhstan
Medalists at the 1994 Asian Games
Universiade silver medalists for the Soviet Union
Medalists at the 1989 Summer Universiade
Medalists at the 1993 Summer Universiade
Competitors at the 1994 Goodwill Games
People from Shymkent